KVEG (HOT 97.5)  is a Rhythmic Contemporary Hit Radio station serving the Las Vegas area. The Kemp Broadcasting outlet operates at 97.5MHz with an ERP of 100kW and is licensed to Mesquite, Nevada. KVEG studios are located at the south end of the Las Vegas Strip and its transmitter is based near Moapa Valley.

History
KVEG originally signed on the air in 2001 as a Mainstream Urban outlet targeting the Hispanic audience. By 2002 they would shift to a Rhythmic Contemporary Hits direction by adding Rhythmic Pop and Dance product, competing with KLUC and KVGS. After KVGS switched to Urban Contemporary in late 2002 (now AAA format) KVEG gained more competition from KWID, but it was short-lived. KVEG would later see competition from rhythmic adult stations KPLV (now Mainstream Rock) and KOAS (as of 2009).

By 2008, KVEG began to top KLUC after the latter started to shift towards mainstream (it shifted back to Rhythmic until 2014). KVEG returned to a more Hip hop and R&B format by 2011, occasionally adding crossover pop hits. As of 2013, KVEG moved toward a center demographic by concentrating on current Rhythmic product.

KVEG was once the Las Vegas callsign of AM 1400, during the 1980s.

References

VEG
Rhythmic contemporary radio stations in the United States
Radio stations established in 2001
2001 establishments in Nevada